Jeremy Suarez (born July 6, 1990) is an American actor, best known for his role as Jordan Thomkins on The Bernie Mac Show (2001–2006), and as the voice of Koda in Brother Bear (2003) and Brother Bear 2 (2006).

Beginning his career as a child actor at the age of five, he first appeared as Tyson Tidwell in Jerry Maguire (1996), and most recently appeared as Nathaniel in The Fix (2017). Throughout his career, Suarez has been nominated for two NAACP Image Awards, two Young Artist Awards and an Annie Award.

Biography 
Suarez is of African and Cuban descent, and is the oldest of three siblings.

In 1996, he made his debut in Jerry Maguire as Rod Tidwell's son Tyson. He appeared in the short-lived sitcom Built to Last (1997) as Ryce Watkins, the youngest son in a family of seven. Suarez made guest appearances on sitcoms Sister, Sister (1996) and The Wayans Bros. (1998), and had a recurring role as Raymond Wilkes on medical drama Chicago Hope (1996−98).

When Suarez was 11 years old, he joined the cast of the sitcom The Bernie Mac Show (2001−06) as Jordan Thomkins, the nephew of the titular character Bernie Mac. For portraying Jordan, Suarez received two NAACP Image Award nominations. Suarez appeared on Larry King Live in 2008 with his fellow cast to discuss Mac's death.

He voiced Koda, a bear cub whose mother was killed by the protagonist, in the Disney film Brother Bear (2003). A book author believed Suarez's performance was the best in the film. Suarez received an Annie Award nomination for Outstanding Achievement for Voice Acting in a Feature Production as Koda, but lost to Ellen DeGeneres. He reprised the role of Koda in sequel Brother Bear 2 (2006).

In 2004, Suarez appeared in two feature films. He provided the voice of Russell in an animated sequence of Fat Albert and portrayed Li'l Gawain in The Ladykillers. Following the end of The Bernie Mac Show, Suarez struggled to find acting work and found employment in more conventional jobs outside of the film industry, including as a boilermaker.

Most of Suarez's work post-Bernie Mac have been in voice-overs, guest starring on King of the Hill and voicing a puppet in Nike commercials during the 2009 NBA Playoffs. He provided Kai's voice in the animated feature film, Zambezia (2012). In Angry Video Game Nerd: The Movie (2014), Suarez played Cooper Folly, the nerd's sidekick.

Filmography

Awards and nominations

References

External links 

1990 births
Living people
African-American male actors
American male child actors
American male film actors
American male television actors
American male voice actors
American people of Cuban descent
Hispanic and Latino American male actors
People from Burbank, California
Male actors from Greater Los Angeles
20th-century African-American people
21st-century African-American people
20th-century American male actors
21st-century American male actors